Gilberto Fernández (February 13, 1935 – September 30, 2011) was the Auxiliary Bishop of the Roman Catholic Archdiocese of Miami.

Priesthood at the Archdiocese of Havana
Bishop Fernández was born in Havana, Cuba. He studied at the Buen Pastor Seminary in Havana, and was ordained for the Archdiocese of Havana on May 17, 1959. He served in four parishes in the Havana area as the Assistant Pastor for El Salvador Church in Cerro, Havana (1959–1960), as the Administrator to  St. Peter's Church in Batabanó, Havana (1960–1961), as the Administrator of the Cathedral of Havana (1961–1962) and as the Pastor to El Cerro Church, Havana (1962–1966), before coming to Miami in July 1967.

Priesthood at the Archdiocese of Miami
In Miami he served as Assistant Pastor at St. Ann's Mission in Naranja (September 1967 – October 1969), as the Administrator, Our Lady Queen of Peace in  Delray Beach (October 1969 – September 1971), as Assistant Pastor at St. Patrick Church, Miami Beach (September 1971 – June 1974), as Pastor, Sacred Heart Church in Homestead (June 1974 – May 1979), as the Pastor of  Sts. Peter and Paul Church in  Miami (May 1979 – April 1988), as the Pastor at San Pablo Church in Marathon (April 1988 – December 1989), as Pastor at St. Kevin Church in Miami (December 1989 – June 1996) and as the Spiritual Director, St. John Vianney Seminary, Miami (June 1996 – June 1997).

Auxiliary Bishop of Archdiocese of Miami
He was appointed as an auxiliary bishop of Miami and the Titular Bishop of Hirina on June 23, 1997, and was consecrated a bishop on September 3, 1997. His principal consecrator was the then- Archbishop of Miami, John Clement Favalora. His co-consecrators were Archbishop Edward Anthony McCarthy and Auxiliary Bishop Agustin Roman, all of Miami.

Auxiliary Bishop Fernández resigned as auxiliary bishop because of health reasons on December 10, 2002. At the time, he did not disclose what they were, but asked the people of South Florida "to help me with your prayers, and I will help you also with mine." At the time of his death, news reports said he had suffered from Alzheimer's disease.

Auxiliary Bishop Fernández, 76, died, after a long illness, on Friday, September 30, 2011. The current archbishop of Miami, Thomas G. Wenski, celebrated a Funeral Mass on Monday, October 3, 2011, for him. Those who worked with the late Bishop said they will remember him as being humble, gentle and "a true Christian gentleman." Archbishop Wenski called him his "twin," referring to the fact that they were consecrated together as auxiliary bishops of Miami on September 3, 1997, by the now-retired Archbishop Favalora. He retired after just a few years as a bishop, "but his long illness was a cross that he embraced and offered" for the Miami Archdiocese, the Archbishop said in a statement. "We trust that he will continue to pray for us as we now entrust his soul to the Lord. May he rest in peace." The Funeral Mass was celebrated at St. Mary Cathedral, followed by burial in the priests section of Our Lady of Mercy Cemetery in Miami.

His Family
His parents were Jose Fernández and Consuelo Villar. His siblings are Msgr. Orlando Fernández (1926–2000), and Father Nelson Fernández, both of the Archdiocese of Miami; another brother, Fausto Fernández, is administrator of Marian Towers, an archdiocesan apartment complex for low-income elderly; Sister Lilia Fernández is a Sisters of St. Joseph of  St. Augustine who ministers at Mercy Hospital in Coconut Grove; two other sisters, Ondina and Teresita, live in Miami and another brother, Miguel Angel Fernández, lives in Mexico with his wife and two daughters.

References

External links

 Episcopologio de la Iglesia Católica en Cuba bio 
 Obituary

Episcopal succession

1935 births
2011 deaths
People from Havana
21st-century American Roman Catholic titular bishops
Cuban emigrants to the United States
20th-century American Roman Catholic titular bishops
20th-century Cuban Roman Catholic priests
Roman Catholic Archdiocese of Miami
People from Homestead, Florida
Religious leaders from Florida
Catholics from Florida